The 2016–17 season is Barnet's 129th year in existence and second consecutive season in League Two. Along with competing in League Two, the club also participated in the FA Cup, EFL Cup and EFL Trophy.

Martin Allen left for Eastleigh on 1 December, and Rossi Eames & Henry Newman were appointed interim managers on the same date. Eames took charge of a win over Morecambe alone on 14 February, and Newman departed the club the following day. Kevin Nugent was then appointed first team coach on the same day, with Eames assisting. Nugent left by mutual consent on 15 April 2017, with Eames returning to take charge of the team.

The season covers the period from 1 July 2016 to 30 June 2017.

Transfers

In

Out

Loans in

Loans out

Competitions

Pre-season friendlies

League Two

League table

Matches

FA Cup

EFL Cup

EFL Trophy

Middlesex Senior Cup

Squad statistics

Appearances and goals

Top scorers

References

Barnet
Barnet F.C. seasons